Henri Ikonen (born April 17, 1994) is a Finnish professional ice hockey forward currently playing for Lukko in the Liiga. Ikonen was selected by the Tampa Bay Lightning in the 6th round (154th overall) of the 2013 NHL Entry Draft.

Playing career
Ikonen made his professional and SM-liiga debut with KalPa Kuopio during the 2011–12 season. He played the 2012–13 season in the Ontario Hockey League with the Kingston Frontenacs.

On April 6, 2014, Ikonen was signed to a three-year entry level contract with the Tampa Bay Lightning.

At the conclusion of his entry-level contract and without appearing in a NHL contest with the Lightning, Ikonen returned to Finland in agreeing to a two-year contract with Jokerit of the KHL on June 19, 2017.

Career statistics

Regular season and playoffs

International

References

External links

1994 births
Living people
People from Savonlinna
HC Donbass draft picks
Finnish expatriate ice hockey players in the United States
Finnish ice hockey left wingers
Greenville Swamp Rabbits players
Jokerit players
KalPa players
Kingston Frontenacs players
Lukko players
Syracuse Crunch players
Tampa Bay Lightning draft picks
Sportspeople from South Savo